James Randolph Lindesay-Bethune, 16th Earl of Lindsay,  (born 19 November 1955), is a British businessman and Conservative politician.

Early life
The son of David Lindesay-Bethune, 15th Earl of Lindsay, and his first wife Mary Douglas-Scott-Montagu, he was educated at Eton, the University of Edinburgh and the University of California, Davis.

Career
He succeeded his father as Earl of Lindsay in 1989. He was vice-chairman of the Inter-Party Union Committee on Environment 1994–95, and was Parliamentary Under-Secretary of State for Scotland from 1995 to 1997, during which time he was responsible for agriculture, fisheries and environment. His work has been involved with the environment and the food industry. Between 2012 and 2017, Lord Lindsay was President of the National Trust of Scotland and was appointed as President of the Chartered Trading Standards Institute in April 2021.

Personal life
In 1982 he married Diana Mary Chamberlayne-Macdonald, a granddaughter of Sir Alexander Somerled Angus Bosville Macdonald of Sleat, 16th Baronet; the two have five children:

 Lady Frances Mary Lindesay-Bethune (b. 1986), married to Rostislav Gabinsky. They have a son, Alexander Fabian (b. 2018).
 Lady Alexandra Penelope Lindesay-Bethune (b. 1988), married to Jack Coleman. They have two sons: Nicholas Tankerville Wallace (b. 2019) and James Horatio Somerled (b. 2021).
 William James Lindesay-Bethune, Viscount of Garnock (b. 30 December 1990)
 The Hon. David Nigel Lindesay-Bethune (b. 1993)
 Lady Charlotte Diana Lindesay-Bethune (b. 1993), married to Prince Jaime of Bourbon-Two Sicilies, Duke of Noto, eldest child of Prince Pedro of Bourbon-Two Sicilies, on 25 September 2021 at Monreale Cathedral.

The Countess of Lindsay is a patroness of the Royal Caledonian Ball and a master of the Fife Foxhounds.

References

Links

External links

Profile on parliament.uk

1955 births
Alumni of the University of Edinburgh
Conservative Party (UK) hereditary peers
Deputy Lieutenants of Fife
Earls of Lindsay
Living people
People educated at Eton College
Scottish businesspeople
University of California, Davis alumni
Place of birth missing (living people)
James
Presidents of the Royal Scottish Geographical Society

Hereditary peers elected under the House of Lords Act 1999